Eaton Hall may refer to:

 Eaton Hall, Cheshire, England, a private country house owned by the Duke of Westminster
 Eaton Hall, Herefordshire, England, a building in Herefordshire
 Eaton Hall (King City) in King City, Ontario, Canada, a Norman-style chateau converted to a public hotel
 Eaton Hall (Tufts University) on the Tufts University Medford/Somerville campus in Boston, Massachusetts, USA
 Eaton Hall (Oregon) at Willamette University in Salem, Oregon, USA

Architectural disambiguation pages